Suzanne Murphy is an Irish soprano. Born in Limerick, she sang with the Welsh National Opera and provided vocals for the soundtrack to the film Amadeus. She is a founder-director of Opera Collective Ireland. , she teaches at the Royal Welsh College of Music and Drama.

References

Year of birth missing (living people)
Living people
Musicians from County Limerick
Irish operatic sopranos
20th-century Irish women singers